Hillington may refer to:

 Hillington, Norfolk, England
 Hillington, Scotland

See also
 Hillingdon, London